Teodor Anghelini (born 9 March 1954 in Braşov) is a retired Romanian footballer and current youth coach.

Anghelini, who is of Italian descent, played for hometown club FC Braşov between 1971 and 1974, before joining Steaua București, where he won two league titles and two Romanian Cups. He played until 1983 at the Bucharest side, being ranked eight amongst the players with the most league appearances for the club. In 1983, he played for lower league side ASA Mizil, before retiring in 1985.

Honours
Steaua București
Liga I: 1975–76, 1977–78
Cupa României: 1975–76, 1978–79

References

External links

1954 births
Association football defenders
Living people
Sportspeople from Brașov
Romanian footballers
Olympic footballers of Romania
Romania international footballers
Romanian people of Italian descent
Liga I players
FC Steaua București players
FC Brașov (1936) players
FC Steaua București assistant managers